Marcelo Peterson (born 15 November 1961) is a Micronesian politician. Peterson served as lieutenant governor from 2012 to 2015 until he assumed the position of acting governor after Governor John Ehsa resigned from office sometime later in 2015.

Peterson was officially sworn in as the seventh Governor of Pohnpei, one of the four states that constitute the Federated States of Micronesia, on 11 January 2016.

References

Living people
Lieutenant Governors of Pohnpei
Governors of Pohnpei
Micronesian people
1961 births